The 2002 ICC Six Nations Challenge was the second edition of the ICC Six Nations Challenge. It was an international limited-overs cricket tournament held in Namibia from 7 to 14 April 2002. All matches at the tournament were played in Windhoek.

Squads

Round-robin

Points table

Fixtures

Final

Statistics

Most runs
The top five run-scorers are included in this table, ranked by runs scored, then by batting average, and then alphabetically.

Source: CricketArchive

Most wickets

The top five wicket-takers are listed in this table, ranked by wickets taken and then by bowling average.

Source: CricketArchive

References

External links
 Tournament information at CricketArchive
 Tournament information at ESPNcricinfo

International cricket competitions in 2001–02
Cri
International cricket competitions in Namibia
ICC Six Nations Challenge